Trifolium monanthum is a species of clover known by the common name mountain carpet clover.

It is native to eastern California and western Nevada in the Sierra Nevada, and in Southern California in the eastern Transverse Ranges, and the San Jacinto Mountains. It occurs at elevations above  in coniferous forests, woodlands, and meadows.

Description
Trifolium monanthum is a small perennial herb forming small clumps of hairless or slightly hairy herbage. The leaves are made up of oval leaflets up to 1.2 centimeters in length.

The inflorescence is reduced with only a few flowers, or a single flower. The flower corolla measures up to 1.2 centimeters long and is white, sometimes with lavender speckles.  The bloom period is April to June.

References

External links
Calflora: Trifolium monanthum (Carpet clover,  Mountain carpet clover)
Jepson Manual eFlora (TJM2) treatment of Trifolium monanthum
UC CalPhotos gallery: Trifolium monanthum

monanthum
Flora of California
Flora of Nevada
Flora of the Sierra Nevada (United States)
Natural history of the Transverse Ranges
Flora without expected TNC conservation status